Lura Church is a parish church of the Church of Norway in the large Sandnes municipality in Rogaland county, Norway. It is located in the borough of Lura in the northern part of the city of Sandnes in the extreme western part of the municipality. It is the church for the Lura parish which is part of the Sandnes prosti (deanery) in the Diocese of Stavanger. The red, brick church was built in a fan-shaped design in 1987 using plans drawn up by the architects Ingeborg and Knut Hoem. The church seats about 320 people.

See also
List of churches in Rogaland

References

Sandnes
Churches in Rogaland
Brick churches in Norway
20th-century Church of Norway church buildings
Churches completed in 1987
1987 establishments in Norway